Bunch is an unincorporated community in Laurel County, Kentucky, United States. It is also known as Dog Branch.

References

Unincorporated communities in Laurel County, Kentucky
Unincorporated communities in Kentucky